WFLA-FM (100.7 MHz) is a commercial radio station licensed to Midway, Florida, and serving the Tallahassee metropolitan area.  It broadcasts a talk radio format and is owned by iHeartMedia, Inc.  The studios and offices are on John Knox Road in Tallahassee.

WFLA-FM has an effective radiated power (ERP) of 11,500 watts.  The transmitter is on William Reeves Road near Interstate 10 in Tallahassee.

Programming
Weekdays on WFLA-FM begin with a local news and interview show hosted by Preston Scott. The rest of the weekday schedule is nationally syndicated talk shows, mostly from co-owned Premiere Networks:  The Glenn Beck Program, The Clay Travis and Buck Sexton Show, The Sean Hannity Show, The Mark Levin Show, The Ramsey Show with Dave Ramsey, Ground Zero with Clyde Lewis, Coast to Coast AM with George Noory and This Morning, America's First News with Gordon Deal.

Weekends feature specialty shows on money, health, gardening and the outdoors, some of which are paid brokered programming.  Syndicated weekend shows include Bill Handel on the Law, At Home with Gary Sullivan, The Tech Guy with Leo Laporte, Sunday Night Live with Bill Cunningham and Somewhere in Time with Art Bell.  Most hours begin with an update from Fox News Radio.

History
The construction permit for a new Tallahassee-area FM outlet was obtained from the Federal Communications Commission (FCC) in 1991.  The unbuilt station was given the working call sign WTPS.  When the station signed on in 1996, it took the call letters WJZT, to reflect its smooth jazz format and its Tallahassee location.  It was owned by Paxson Communications, headed by broadcasting executive and owner Bud Paxson.  A short time later, WJZT switched to a format of 1980s and 90s hits.

In 1997, it was acquired by San Antonio-based Clear Channel Communications (a forerunner to iHeartMedia).  The station went through several formats and call sign changes over the next several years.  It had an urban contemporary sound as WBWT until July 10, 2006.  At that point, management decided to flip the format to talk radio, using the call letters of its popular Tampa Bay sister station WFLA 970 AM, but adding the -FM suffix.  WFLA-FM shares most of the nationally syndicated shows heard on 970 WFLA, but it has its own morning drive time program.

References

External links
Official Website

FLA-FM
WFLA-FM
Radio stations established in 1995
IHeartMedia radio stations
1995 establishments in Florida